Hendon South was a constituency in the former Municipal Borough of Hendon (in 1965 subsumed into the London Borough of Barnet) which returned one Member of Parliament (MP) to the House of Commons of the Parliament of the United Kingdom. It was created for the 1945 general election, when the Hendon seat was split into two, and abolished for the 1997 general election, with Childs Hill, Garden Suburb, and Golders Green wards going to Finchley and Golders Green along with wards from Finchley. Hendon and West Hendon wards were transferred to new constituency: Hendon.

Boundaries
1945–1974: The Municipal Borough of Hendon wards of Central Hendon, Childs Hill, Garden Suburb, Golders Green, and Park.

1974–1997: The London Borough of Barnet wards of Childs Hill, Garden Suburb, Golders Green, Hendon, and West Hendon.

Members of Parliament

Elections

Elections in the 1940s

Elections in the 1950s

Elections in the 1960s

Elections in the 1970s

Elections in the 1980s

Elections in the 1990s

Notes and references

Parliamentary constituencies in London (historic)
Constituencies of the Parliament of the United Kingdom established in 1945
Constituencies of the Parliament of the United Kingdom disestablished in 1997
Hendon